Edy Gunawan (born 25 September 1985) is an Indonesian professional footballer who plays as a left-back or winger for Liga 2 club Persiba Balikpapan.

Club career 
On May 30, 2014, he joined Persela Lamongan. On November 12, 2014, he signed with Barito Putera.

Honours

Club
Persebaya Surabaya
Malaysia-Indonesia Unity Cup: 2011
Indonesia Premier League runner-up: 2011–12

References

External links 
 
 Edy Gunawan at Liga Indonesia

1985 births
Living people
People from Balikpapan
Indonesian footballers
Liga 1 (Indonesia) players
Indonesian Premier League players
Persiba Balikpapan players
Persebaya Surabaya players
Persela Lamongan players
PS Barito Putera players
Sportspeople from East Kalimantan
Association football defenders